The Paleo Foundation is a private American organization that certifies food products related to the Paleolithic and ketogenic diet.

Programs 
The organization currently issues a 'Certified Paleo' certification mark, with a previous iteration called "Paleo Friendly", for food products and dietary supplements that meet its standards. By 2018, it had certified food products from various food retailers and companies including Whole Foods, Walmart, and General Mills. Recently, the organization also begun certifying food products for its 'Keto Certified' program.

Standards development 
In 2015, its founder, Karen Pendergrass, stated that the organization developed its standards for the Paleo diet based on "current research, archaeological records, paleogenetics, sustainability concerns, proposed health benefits, and input from various leading health experts of the Paleo Movement."

Criticism 

Many nutrition and law experts have also been critical of such food certification programs, citing fears of arbitrary criteria that lack evidence within the certification standards and the lack of regulation by government agencies. They have since not been investigated.

See also 

 Paleolithic diet
 Product certification
 Certification mark
 Mark Sisson

References

External links 
 Official website


Certification marks
Food- and drink-related organizations
Standards organizations in the United States